A rubidium standard or rubidium atomic clock is a frequency standard in which a specified hyperfine transition of electrons in rubidium-87 atoms is used to control the output frequency.

Synopsis
The Rb standard is the most inexpensive, compact, and widely produced atomic clock, used to control the frequency of television stations, cell phone base stations, in test equipment, and global navigation satellite systems like GPS. Commercial rubidium clocks are less accurate than caesium atomic clocks, which serve as primary frequency standards, so the rubidium clock is a secondary frequency standard. 

All commercial rubidium frequency standards operate by disciplining a crystal oscillator to the rubidium hyperfine transition of 6.8 GHz. The intensity of light from a rubidium discharge lamp that reaches a photodetector through a resonance cell will drop by about 0.1% when the rubidium vapor in the resonance cell is exposed to microwave power near the transition frequency. The crystal oscillator is stabilized to the rubidium transition by detecting the light dip while sweeping an RF synthesizer (referenced to the crystal) through the transition frequency.

See also
 Hydrogen maser

References

Bibliography
 Stanford Research Systems documentation on the PRS10 frequency standard

External links 
 NIST Time & Frequency A-Z Glossary - Resonance Frequency
 Secondary Representation of the SI Second
 PTB "Unit of Time"
 USNO Rubidium Fountain Project
 NPL Rubidium Fountain

Electronics standards
Atomic clocks
Rubidium